Pallegama is a village in Sri Lanka. Pallegama may also refer to the following villages in Sri Lanka
Ankumbura Pallegama 
Atabage Pallegama 
Haputale Pallegama 
Migammana Pallegama 
Pallegama Ihalagammedda 
Pallegama Pahalagammedda 
Tembiligala Pallegama
Udagama Pallegama 
Uduwela Pallegama 
Vilana Pallegama 
Yatihalagala Pallegama